First Lady of Romania is an unofficial honorific applied to the wife of the president of Romania, concurrent with his term of office.

Current
The current first lady is Carmen Iohannis, the wife of the 5th president of Romania, Klaus Iohannis. At present, there are three living former first ladies: Maria Băsescu, wife of Traian Băsescu; Nina Iliescu, wife of  Ion Iliescu,  and Nadia Ileana Bogorin, wife of Emil Constantinescu.

List of first ladies
Elena Ceaușescu – (28 March 1974 – 22 December 1989)
Nina Iliescu – (22 December 1989 – 29 November 1996)
Nadia Ileana Bogorin – (29 November 1996 – 20 December 2000)
Nina Iliescu – (20 December 2000 – 20 December 2004)
Maria Băsescu – (20 December 2004 – 21 December 2014)
Carmen Iohannis – (21 December 2014 – Present)

References

 
Romania